The Yu Gong or Tribute of Yu is a chapter of the Book of Xia (夏書/夏书)  section of the Book of Documents, one of the Five Classics of ancient Chinese literature.  The chapter describes the legendary Yu the Great and the provinces of his time.  Most modern scholars believe it was written in the fifth century BCE or later.

Contents and significance

The chapter can be divided into two parts.  The first describes the nine provinces of Ji (冀), Yan (兗), Qing (青), Xu (徐), Yang (揚), Jing (荊), Yu (豫), Liang (梁), and Yong (雍), with the improvement works conducted by Yu in each province.  The second enumerates Yu's surveys of the rivers of the empire, followed by an idealized description of five concentric domains of five hundred li each, from the royal domain (甸服 Diānfú) around the capital to the remote wild domain (荒服 Huāngfú).
Later, this would become important in the justification for the concept of Tianxia or "All Under Heaven" as a means to back up the territorial and other claims of successive Chinese dynasties.

Origin and versions
Although the Yu Gong is traditionally dated to the Xia Dynasty (c. 2070 – c. 1600 BCE), most modern scholars agree that the work is considerably more recent.
Tradition dictates that Confucius (551–479 BCE) compiled the Book of Documents and included the Yu Gong, although it is more likely that this was done later. Wang Guowei suggested in his New Confirmation of Ancient History (古史新证) that the Yu Gong was written at the start of the Zhou Dynasty, but most scholars now agree with the view of Gu Jiegang that it is a product of the Warring States, Qin or Early Han periods.

References to maritime history in the Analects of Confucius and the Yu Gong suggest their origin in a single culture while the appearance of the West River (西河) and South River (南河)  in the latter indicate that the author came from the State of Wei. In the preface to his Commentary on the Yu Gong Map (禹贡图注), Ming Dynasty Scholar Ài Nányīng (艾南英) (1583－1646) considered the Yu Gong  the "progenitor of all geographic texts both ancient and modern."

Commentaries
Over the centuries numerous scholars have written interpretations of and commentaries on the Yu Gong. In 2006 the Xi'an Map Publishing Agency (西安地圖出版社) published a compilation of 55 titles dating from the Song to the Qing Dynasties.  Notable amongst the volumes included in the collection are:
 Mao Huang (毛晃) Yugong Zhinan (禹貢指南).
 Cheng Dachang (程大昌) Yugong Lun (禹貢論) and Yugong Shanchuan Dili Tu (禹貢山川地理圖) .
 Hu Wei (胡渭) Yugong Zhuizhi (禹貢錐指).

Notes and references
This article is partly based on a translation of 禹貢 in the Chinese Wikipedia

External links

 禹貢 - Tribute of Yu at the Chinese Text Project: Chinese text with James Legge's English translation (amended to employ pinyin)

Chinese history texts
Chinese classic texts
Confucian texts
Geographic history of China
Book of Documents